Glen McKinnon (born 16 December 1937) is a Canadian educator and politician from Manitoba. He represented the federal electoral district of Brandon—Souris in the House of Commons of Canada from 1993 to 1997 as a member of the Liberal Party. He was elected in the 1993 Canadian federal election, then fell into third place behind Progressive Conservative candidate Rick Borotsik and Reform candidate Edward Agnew in the 1997 federal election. He previously ran as a Manitoba Liberal candidate in the district of Arthur-Virden in the 1990 provincial election, coming second to PC incumbent Jim Downey.

Born in Carberry, Manitoba, McKinnon resides in Virden, Manitoba. He was employed at Virden Collegiate Institute for several years, serving as principal, football coach, and biology teacher. He and his wife Karen have three daughters.

Electoral history

References
 

1937 births
Liberal Party of Canada MPs
Living people
Manitoba Liberal Party candidates in Manitoba provincial elections
Members of the House of Commons of Canada from Manitoba
People from Carberry, Manitoba